Afag Suleyman gizi Malikova (born January 18, 1947) is a Soviet Azerbaijani dancer. She was awarded the Honored Artist of the Azerbaijan SSR (1975), and People's Artist of the Azerbaijan SSR (1978).

Biography 
Afag Malikova was born on January 18, 1947, in Baku. In 1963–1974, she was a soloist of the Azerbaijan State Song and Dance Ensemble. Since 1974, she has been a soloist and coach pedagogue of the Azerbaijan State Dance Ensemble. Since 1982, she has been working as the artistic director of the State Dance Ensemble.

A. Malikova performed in a number of foreign countries (Turkey, Egypt, Poland, France, England, Canada, Portugal, Germany, Spain, etc.).

On April 11, 1975, she was awarded the honorary title of "Honored Artist of the Azerbaijan SSR", and on January 11, 1978, she was awarded the honorary title of "People's Artist of the Azerbaijan SSR". She was awarded the Azerbaijan Shohrat Order on December 28, 2001, and the Sharaf Order on May 16, 2017.

References 

Living people
1947 births
Honored Artists of the Azerbaijan SSR
Recipients of the Sharaf Order
Recipients of the Shohrat Order
Azerbaijani female dancers
People's Artists of the Azerbaijan SSR